The Grenfell railway line is a partly closed railway line in New South Wales, Australia. It branches from the Blayney–Demondrille railway line at the town of Koorawatha. The line opened in 1901, and closed between Greenethorpe and at the Grenfell railway station in 1991.

From the opening, until the demise of steam, there were two locations where locomotives could obtain water, Koorawatha and Grenfell. The stand eventually collapsed at 5:40pm on 9 February 2018. The dam, Company Dam, still remains and now supplies irrigation water to a local sporting ground.

Grain services operate between Koorawatha and Greenethorpe. Passenger services operated until 1974. The line is owned by the NSW government, but in 2004 the Australian Rail Track Corporation became responsible for co-ordinating operations over the line.

Gallery

See also
 Rail transport in New South Wales

References

Further reading 

Regional railway lines in New South Wales
Standard gauge railways in Australia
Railway lines opened in 1901
Railway lines closed in 1991
Blayney–Demondrille railway line